"The One" is the debut single by Polish singer Aneta Sablik. She premiered the single at the final of the 11th season of German casting show Deutschland sucht den Superstar. Aneta Sablik was announced in the night of May 3, 2015 as the show's winner, making Meltem Ackigöz the runner-up. The song was released on May 3, 2014 to digital outlets from Oceania and Europe, debuting at the number-one in the iTunes download charts of all German-speaking countries. It later debuted on the first position in the official charts of Germany, Austria, Switzerland and Luxembourg.

Critical reception
OK! found the song  "very catchy" and "ideally suited for the mainstream."

Chart performance

Certifications

References

2014 songs
2014 singles
Eurodance songs
Polydor Records singles
Number-one singles in Austria
Number-one singles in Germany
Number-one singles in Switzerland